Sadak Chhap is a 1987 Indian Hindi-language action drama film produced and directed by Anil Ganguly. It stars Jackie Shroff, Padmini Kolhapure, Richa Sharma in pivotal roles.

Cast

 Jackie Shroff as Shankar
 Padmini Kolhapure as Anju
 Richa Sharma as Natasha
 Biswajeet as Laxman  
 Anjana Mumtaz as Shankar's Mother
 Amrish Puri as MP Dharamdas
 Deven Verma as Ramaiya
 Gulshan Grover as Romi
 Moolchand as Jewelr 
 Nandita Thakur as Natasha's Maidservant
 Vijay Arora as Police Inspector
 Goga Kapoor as Goga
 Tiku Talsania as Jaikishan
 Padma Khanna
 Dinesh Hingoo as Ghasitaram Todarmal  
 Huma Khan as Julie
 Bharati Achrekar as Kamla 
 Usha Nadkarni as Ramaiya's Mother
 Manik Irani as Billa
 Abhi Bhattacharya as Police Commissioner
 Jankidas as Seth Janikidas

Music
Lyrics: Anjaan

References

External links

Films scored by Bappi Lahiri
1980s Hindi-language films
1987 films
Films directed by Anil Ganguly
Indian action drama films